Elisa Zulueta (born on September 14, 1981, in Santiago) is a Chilean television, theatre and film actress who studied at the Pontificia Universidad Católica de Chile. Formerly, she worked for TVN where she made little works in telenovelas and series. In 2008 she gained fame with the role of Julia Amigo in the telenovela Lola of Canal 13. In 2009, Elisa Zulueta and Emilio Edwards were the main roles for the Chilean film Tanto Tiempo, directed by Claudio Polgati, this film won two prizes in the eight version of the Festival Internacional de Cine Chico de Canarias.

Filmography

Films
 Tanto Tiempo (2009) – Elisa
 Que Pena tu Familia (2012) – Valentina

Television
 Mi Primera Vez (2006, TVN) – Student
 Floribella (2006, TVN) – Nurse
 Lola (2007–2008, Canal 13) – Julia Amigo
 Feroz (2010, Canal 13) – Valentina
 Soltera Otra Vez (2012, Canal 13) – Marjorie López
 Dama y Obrero (2012, TVN) – Mireya Ledesma
 Socias (2013, TVN) – Dolores Montt
 No Abras la Puerta (2014, TVN) – Silvana Bunivic
 Juana Brava (2015, TVN) - Juana Bravo
 Por Fin Solos (TVN, 2016) - Catalina

Theatre
As an actress
 Nagy (2005)
 Ricardo III (2005)
 Macbeth (2005)
 Estaciones de Paso (2007)
 Talk Radio (2008)
 Gladys (2012–2014)
 La Grabación (2013–2014)

As a director
 Pérez (2009)
 Gladys (2011–2014)

As a playwright
 Pérez (2009)
 Gladys (2011)
 Mía (2012)

References

External links
https://web.archive.org/web/20170917154740/http://tantotiempo.cl/ Official website of the film Tanto Tiempo

1981 births
Chilean stage actresses
Chilean film actresses
Chilean theatre directors
Chilean people of Basque descent
Living people
Actresses from Santiago
Pontifical Catholic University of Chile alumni
Chilean telenovela actresses
Chilean women dramatists and playwrights
Writers from Santiago
21st-century Chilean actresses
21st-century Chilean women writers
21st-century Chilean dramatists and playwrights